The Man is the self-produced eighth album by soul singer Barry White, released in 1978 on the revived 20th Century-Fox Records label, which saw its name reverted from 20th Century.

History
The album became White's sixth R&B chart topper and peaked at #36 on the pop chart. Lead single "Your Sweetness Is My Weakness" reached #2 on the R&B chart and #60 on the Billboard Hot 100, while White's cover of Billy Joel's "Just the Way You Are" reached #45 on the R&B chart and peaked at #12 on the UK Singles Chart. A third single, "Sha La La Means I Love You", peaked at #55 on the UK Singles Chart. A cover version of "It's Only Love Doing Its Thing" (with the shortened title "It's Only Love") would be a hit for British band Simply Red in 1989. The album was digitally remastered and reissued on CD on September 24, 1996 by Mercury Records.

Track listing

Charts

Weekly charts

Year-end charts

Singles

Certifications and sales

See also
List of number-one R&B albums of 1978 (U.S.)

References

External links
 The Man at Discogs

1978 albums
Barry White albums
20th Century Fox Records albums